Bhagwati Temple or Chandi Bhagwati Temple (Nepali language:चण्डी भगवती मन्दिर) is a famous Hindu temple situated in the heart of Rajbiraj, Saptari. This temple, whose major deity goddess is Bhagwati is a main attraction for Nepali and Indian pilgrims. People are likely to come here during Bada Dashain. Some thousands of goats are sacrificed here during Dashain. The temple complex holds many Hindu god and goddess temples like Hanuman Temple, Shiva Temple and Bishwakarma Temple. A small pond Bhagwati Pokhari is located backside of the temple, where Chhath is performed every year.

History
The temple holds great historical, cultural and religious significance in locale and neighbors area. The temple was built in 1925 and redesigned in different era.

The Pandit Ji of Bhagwati Temple is Shree Durganand Mishra who is working in a temple since 2002. After that Krishu Zha takes place.

Pilgrimage
Every year, thousands of pilgrims from Nepal, India and other countries visit this sacred temple to worship the Bhagawati. During the festivals of Dashain and Tihar, there is presence of even more worshipers.

References

External links

Hindu temples in Madhesh Province
Durga temples
Religious buildings and structures completed in 1925
Hindu temples practicing animal sacrifice
1925 establishments in Nepal